Orhionmwon is a Local Government Area of Edo State, Nigeria. Its headquarter is in the town of Abudu. It has an area of 2,382 km² and a population of 206,717 at the 2006 census. The postal code of the area is 301.

Orhionmwon local government area of Edo State is considered one of the biggest local government area among those in Benin City. It comprises towns and communities such as Idumodin, Ottah, Okuor, Edummungba, Egbhuru, Egbokor, Ute - Oheze, Ugo, Urhonigbe, Igbanke, Iru egbede, Evbobanosa, Oza, Ogan, Uson, Oloten, Obagie N’Oheze, Idumiru, Idumwebo, Numagbae, Ugokoniro, Ukpato, Igbekhue, iguehanza, Obozogbe-niro and Obi. The local government came about as an aftermath in the creation of the defunct Bendel State. The local government is blessed with rubber plantations,agricultural produces,crude oil as well as mineral resources. Furthermore, the local government is surrounded by neighboring Delta State (Agbor and Eku) as well as some Bini communities such as Ugo and Okogbo.

References

Local Government Areas in Edo State